Abay Babes is a 2018 Filipino comedy film written and directed by Don Cuaresma, starring Cristine Reyes, Nathalie Hart, Meg Imperial, Roxanne Barcelo and Kylie Verzosa. The film was produced by Viva Films and it was released in the Philippines on September 19, 2018.

Cast

References

External links

Philippine comedy films
Viva Films films
Films directed by Don Cuaresma